Dionisiu Miron Bumb (born 19 September 1973) is a Romanian former footballer who played as a midfielder for teams such as: Baia Mare, Apulum Alba Iulia, Gloria Bistriţa or Bihor Oradea, in Romania, Wehen Wiesbaden, in Germany and Pécs, in Hungary.

External links
 
 Kicker.de profile 

1973 births
Living people
People from Carei
Romanian footballers
Association football midfielders
CS Minaur Baia Mare (football) players
CSM Unirea Alba Iulia players
ACF Gloria Bistrița players
FC Bihor Oradea players
Regionalliga players
SV Wehen Wiesbaden players
Nemzeti Bajnokság I players
Pécsi MFC players
Romanian expatriate footballers
Expatriate footballers in Germany
Romanian expatriate sportspeople in Germany
Expatriate footballers in Hungary
Romanian expatriate sportspeople in Hungary